NGC 5609 is a spiral galaxy located 1.3 billion light-years light-years away from Earth, in the constellation Boötes. It has the second largest redshift of any galaxy in the New General Catalogue. Only NGC 1262, another spiral galaxy, has a higher redshift. NGC 5609 was discovered by astronomer Bindon Blood Stoney on March 1, 1851.

See also  
 List of the most distant astronomical objects 
 List of NGC objects (5001–6000)

References

External links 
 

Spiral galaxies
Boötes
5609
3088538
Astronomical objects discovered in 1851
Discoveries by Bindon Blood Stoney